Haapamäki is a village in the municipality of Keuruu, Finland. It is historically an important meeting point of major railway lines, which converge at Haapamäki railway station. According to Statistics Finland, Haapamäki has 857 inhabitants (December 31, 2016), while according to the town of Keuruu, the population of the Haapamäki village area is about 1,500.

In Haapamäki, the basic services are: bank, pharmacy, grocery store, car repair shop, café, veterinarian, barber and flea market. Haapamäki has two small lakes, Lake Petäisjärvi and Lake Niemelänjärvi, as well as a few ponds. Haapamäki also has opportunities for fishing and snowmobile safaris.

References

External links 
 

Villages in Finland
Keuruu